Guardafronteras is a 1981 Cuban drama film directed by Octavio Cortázar. It was entered into the 12th Moscow International Film Festival, where Tito Junco won the award for Best Actor.

Cast
 Javier González
 Tito Junco
 Alberto Pujol
 Maribel Rodríguez
 Mara Roque
 Patricio Wood

See also 
 List of Cuban films

References

External links
 

1981 films
1981 drama films
1980s Spanish-language films
Films directed by Octavio Cortázar
Cuban drama films